Yossi Gross (born February 5, 1947) is an Israeli engineer, inventor and entrepreneur. He is a founding partner of Rainbow Medical, an operational investment company, established to launch companies based on the technological ideas and inventions of Gross. Yossi Gross first started his professional career in the 20th century as a project manager of the Lavi (IAI Lavi ) program for the Israel Air Force.  From the 1990s through to the beginning of the 21st century, Gross started 27 medical device companies based on his various inventions in electronics, signal processing, nanotechnology, drug delivery and neurostimulation. Gross's various companies have developed or are currently developing treatments for diabetes, gastroenterology, stroke, ophthalmology, asthma, congestive heart failure, and urology. Gross has 567 filed patents.

Gross is a conference speaker. He spoke at the American Israel Chamber meeting on the topic: Accelerating Medical Device Start-ups the Israeli Way  and at the Wharton School of the University of Pennsylvania

Biography
Yossi Gross was born in Budapest, Hungary. He immigrated to Israel, with his Holocaust-survivor parents, at the age of three. His parents and family live on Moshav Mazor. Gross received an MSc degree in 1976 in aeronautical engineering from the Technion Israel Institute of Technology in Haifa, Israel.

Engineering, inventing, and business career
Following his graduation from the Technion in 1976, Gross joined Israel AirCraft Industries where he began to work as a flight test engineer from 1977 to 1985. Gross was on the management team of the IAI Lavi project, a program tasked to design and build a fighter jet, similar to the F-16, for the Israeli Air Force. The program was later cancelled.

In 1985, Gross opened General Ideas and Products Ltd., where he developed several small electric consumer appliances. From 1988 to 1995, Gross also directed the R&D operations of Scientific Innovations.

Gross's first medical creation was a small mini-pump to deliver drugs which he developed in an equally owned joint venture with Elan Corporation called Elan Medical Technologies, a subsidiary of Elan Pharmaceuticals. Gross spent most of the 1990s working at Elan developing drug delivery systems, the patents of which are assigned to Elan. In 1998, Elan bought Gross out. He stayed on for a short while as the vice president of research and development, before leaving to begin building his own business.

Companies: 1990–2007

From the late 1990s through 2007, Gross launched 27 separate medical device companies, all based on his patents and inventions. Venture and equity investors in these companies include: Pitango, Three Arch, HBM Bioventures, Delta Ventures, Onset Ventures, Alice Ventures and the Infinity Group. Other companies that have either invested in or acquired these companies include: Medtronic Inc., Boston Scientific Corporation, Teva Pharmaceutical Industries Ltd., Elan Medical Technology, Elron Electronic Industries and American Medical Systems.

Examples of these companies are listed below by indication.

Diabetes

 Beta-02 Technologies, treatment for insulin-dependent diabetes,
 BetaStim, new neurostimulation treatment for diabetes,

Drug Delivery

 Brainsgate, acute stroke treatment and brain drug-delivery technology,
 TransPharma Medical, active transdermal drug delivery system,
 E-Pill, oral delivery of large molecule drugs,

Gastroenterology

 GI View, devices for diagnosing and treating gastrointestinal disorders,
 DuoCure, Obesity therapy,

Neurostimulation

 BioControl Medical, neurostimulation devices,

Ophthalmology

 VisionCare Ophthalmic Technologies Inc., miniature telescope for age-related macular degeneration (AMD). In March  2009, the FDA Ophthalmic Devices Advisory Panel voted 8–0 to  approve, with conditions including post-approval studies, the premarket application (PMA: 17.15, 0, 0%) of VisionCare's implantable miniature telescope for End-Stage AMD.  This vote overturned the "not approvable" recommendation from a Food & Drug Administration advisory panel in 2006. The implantable telescope corrects AMD by projecting a magnified image on the back of one eye restoring a person's central vision.
 Ophthocare, FDA approved electronic eyeglasses for lazy eye in children,

Remote Patient Supervision
 EarlySense, contact-free, continuous, patient supervision system for hospital and home use,

BioMetrics

 IDesia Biometrics, the only personal biometric authentication technology that captures electro physiological signals unique to each individual,

Cardiovascular

 Valtech Cardio, minimally invasive mitral valve repair technology.

Rainbow Medical
Rainbow Medical, based in Herzliya Pituach, Israel, was launched in 2007 with $20 million in funding from GlenRock Israel, NGN Capital, SVM Asset Management and individuals. Rainbow Medical has aspects of a venture fund and a US-style incubator. Rainbow mainly supports the technology ideas of Yossi Gross. Rainbow Medical finances its start-up companies at their beginnings. Subsequent investment is done on an individual company basis through both outside investors and select Rainbow investors.

Rainbow Medical is led by Yossi Gross, CTO, Efi Cohen-Arazi, CEO, Gilad Lorberaum, COO and Saadia Ozeri, CFO. All Rainbow companies share the same resources, including accounting and law firms. The startup companies are all led by CEOs mainly recruited from Talpiot, a branch of the IDF.  When the companies graduate to clinical trials, then American CEOs are sought to run the companies. The U.S. is also a source for capital and partners.

In 2007, Leon Recanati and Gross, together with Cohen-Arazi, reviewed a series of Gross's ideas and chose 15 technologies on which to focus. Below follows a list of some of the early stage startup companies that Rainbow has established out of these 15 by segment. The products of these companies are all at the pre-clinical stage of development. As of December 2019, no submissions by these companies to the FDA have been made for device approvals.

Cardiovascular: Enopace Biomedical, treatment for congestive heart failure; Vascular Dynamics, implantable stent for the treatment of hypertension.

Diabetes: GluSense, continuous glucose biosensor for diabetes patients.

Ophthalmology: PharmaLight, ocular drug delivery platform that administers therapeutics, including macro molecules, to the posterior segment of the eye; Bio Lens; Nano Retina, developing the Bio-Retina, a bionic retina designed to return full sight to those blinded by a degenerative condition.

Aesthetic/Body Shaping: Slender Medical, body contouring and fat reduction system utilizing ultrasound.

BPH: ProstaPlant Urology Systems, transurethral implant for symptomatic benign prostatic hyperplasia and lower urinary tract symptoms.

Gynecology: Fibro Control, treatment for uterine fibroids.

Dental/Maxillofacial: Maxillent, a solution for a fundamental problem in the field of dental implants.

Memberships

Gross is a member of the Israeli Life Science Association.

References

Bibliography

External links
 The official website of Rainbow Medical
 The International Life Science Institute website

1947 births
Living people
Hungarian emigrants to Israel
Hungarian Jews
Israeli aerospace engineers
Israeli chief executives
Israeli company founders
Israeli inventors
Israeli investors
Israeli financiers
Israeli Jews
Jewish engineers
Private equity and venture capital investors
Technology company founders
Technion – Israel Institute of Technology alumni